There is more than one place called Imouzzer:

 Imouzzer Ida Ou Tanane in Agadir-Ida Ou Tanane Prefecture, Souss-Massa-Drâa, Morocco
 Imouzzer Kandar in Sefrou Province, Fès-Boulemane, Morocco
 Imouzzer Marmoucha in Boulemane Province, Fès-Boulemane, Morocco